is a Japanese politician of the Democratic Party of Japan (DPJ), a member of the House of Representatives in the Diet (national legislature).

Overviews 
A native of Agawa District, Kōchi and graduate of Meiji University, he was elected to the House of Representatives for the first time in 1990 as a member of the Japan Socialist Party after unsuccessful runs in 1983 and 1986. In 1996 he participated in the formulation of the DPJ.  Between 1990 and 2012, he represented either the 3rd District or the 4th District of Saitama prefecture.

References

External links
 Official website in Japanese.

Members of the House of Representatives (Japan)
People from Kōchi Prefecture
Living people
1943 births
Social Democratic Party (Japan) politicians
Democratic Party of Japan politicians
Ministers of Health, Labour and Welfare of Japan
21st-century Japanese politicians